Although it is consistently one of the most watched television programs in the United States annually,  broadcasters have sometimes attempted to intentionally counterprogram against the Super Bowl by running new programming against the game as an alternative, such as special episodes of existing series, one-off special presentations, and previews of new series, typically during its halftime break.

The most prominent success of the concept came in 1992, when Fox broadcast a special, live edition of its sketch comedy program In Living Color during halftime at Super Bowl XXVI, taking advantage of the then-unpopular format of Super Bowl halftime shows. The special drew 22 million viewers, prompting the NFL to book more prominent pop music acts to perform at future Super Bowl halftime shows to compete.

Broadcasters who do not air original programming against the Super Bowl will typically air reruns of existing programming—sometimes as marathons, prior to and during the game; in recent years, as all four major networks broadcast NFL games to an extent—and three of them alternate airing the game yearly—the United States' four major television networks have rarely broadcast new programming against the Super Bowl in an effort to protect the game's viewership as a sign of respect, to the point that the broadcast rights to Super Bowl LV and LVI were swapped to prevent a CBS-broadcast Super Bowl LVI from competing with the 2022 Winter Olympics on NBC. Some cable channels and digital platforms have still attempted to air original programming intended as an alternative to halftime or the game itself (such as Animal Planet's annual Puppy Bowl special).

History 
In the 1970s and 1980s, the majority of Super Bowl halftime shows were themed, musical spectacles that often featured marching bands and performance ensembles such as Up with People (who performed in four Super Bowl halftime shows between 1976 and 1986 and performed at the pre-game show of Super Bowl XXV in 1991). The group's halftime shows were described as being "wholesome" and "inoffensive" by critics, but were frequently derided for being dated and out of touch with modern popular culture.

Super Bowl counterprogramming was first popularized by Fox. As an alternative, the then-fledgling Fox network aired a special live episode of its popular sketch comedy show In Living Color during halftime at Super Bowl XXVI (which featured a halftime show entitled "Winter Magic", a Winter Olympics-themed show starring Gloria Estefan, Brian Boitano, and Dorothy Hamill to tie into CBS's upcoming broadcast of the Games). The live episode featured football-themed sketches (such as Men on Football), a performance by Color Me Badd, and a clock counting down to the start of the third quarter. The episode was sponsored by Frito-Lay, who paid $2 million to hold all national advertising time, and to help budget and promote the special; the effort included a $1,000,000 giveaway, whose winner was announced during the broadcast. A CBS executive felt that the concept was "cute", but dismissed concerns that the ambush would have any major impact on the viewership of the Super Bowl. The special drew 20 to 25 million viewers away from the Super Bowl; Nielsen estimated that CBS lost 10 ratings points during halftime as a result of the special.

The unexpected success of the In Living Color special prompted the NFL to heighten the halftime show's profile to help retain viewership; beginning at Super Bowl XXVII in 1993, the NFL began to invite major pop music performers to perform during the halftime show. The first of these, featuring Michael Jackson, led to a dramatic increase in viewership between halvesthe first in the game's history. Later that year, Fox acquired rights to the NFL's National Football Conference (NFC), replacing CBS, beginning in the 1994 season. The acquisition was a notable coup which helped to establish Fox's position as a major network in its own right, and made Fox one of the three cycling broadcasters of the Super Bowl itself.

The NFL has continued to stay true to its goal of ensuring that the halftime show is as much of a spectacle as the game itself, which has complimented the absolute dominance of the Super Bowl in television viewership. Besides a string of halftime shows from 2005 to 2010 that featured veteran rock acts in the wake of the Super Bowl XXXVIII "wardrobe malfunction", the practice of inviting pop acts to perform at the Super Bowl halftime show has continued. The Super Bowl XLIX halftime show featuring Katy Perry was seen by 118.5 million viewers, as part of an overall telecast that was the most-watched television broadcast in American history.

As all four major U.S. television networks currently have ties to the NFL and alternate airing the Super Bowl yearly, Phil Rosenthal of the Chicago Tribune believed that there was now "zero likelihood some broadcast network is going to launch a broadside against the NFL's showcase.", while a GQ writer argued that the practice was now obsolete, due to the larger number of media options that have emerged since. As such, the networks not airing the game will typically air reruns of existing programs. Fox provided an exception in 2010, when it aired new episodes of 'Til Death during the game; Fox had been burning off the fourth season of the low-rated sitcom in unconventional time slots (such as having aired a marathon of four new episodes on Christmas Day), so its distributor would have enough episodes for syndication. The league's cable channel NFL Network also suspends programming during the game, instead airing a live scoreboard and a simulcast of the game's radio broadcast under the title Super Bowl Game Center.

Counterprogramming efforts are not limited to television; for Super Bowl XLV in 2011, WCHK-FM, a station in the Green Bay, Wisconsin area announced it would counterprogram the game with dead air, since the hometown Packers were in the game. However, its goal was not to attract listeners from the game, but to do the opposite. The freeform program Anything Anything with Rich Russo has counterprogrammed the Super Bowl with Dr. Demento.

Counterprogramming has also expanded to the internet; Jewish radio personality Nachum Segal has organized an annual Kosher Halftime Show for streaming via his Nachum Segal Network, featuring performances by Jewish musicians. The special was recorded in Atlanta for 2019, marking the first time it was held in the Super Bowl's host city. In 2015, YouTube streamed an alternative, online halftime show featuring notable personalities from the video sharing service. In 2019, the Super Smash Bros. video game tournament Genesis 6 had top-8 rounds overlapping with Super Bowl LIII, which Shacknews noted were either "intentional or completely by accident".

For the first time in the history of the game, Super Bowl LVI in 2022 fell during an ongoing Winter Olympics, the 2022 Winter Olympics in Beijing. In order to prevent the possibility that NBC would have to counterprogram CBS's telecast of the game with primetime coverage of these Olympics (which would dilute viewership and advertising sales), NBC agreed to swap 2021's Super Bowl LV to CBS in favor of Super Bowl LVI—thus giving NBC rights to both the 2022 Winter Olympics and Super Bowl LVI. NBC thus suspended its coverage of the Olympics in favor of pre-game coverage for the Super Bowl, before resuming with primetime coverage as its lead-out. CBS, its sister premium channel Showtime, and HBO, did air new episodes of Celebrity Big Brother (which averages five episodes per-week), Billions, and Euphoria respectively on the night of the game; HBO announced that Euphoria had achieved a series high of 5.1 million viewers, although this included viewership across both HBO and its on-demand streaming platform HBO Max.

List of notable Super Bowl halftime counterprograms
In regards to original programming, recurring Super Bowl counters have included Animal Planet's annual Puppy Bowl, a special featuring dogs at play in a model football stadium (which itself spawned imitators—the Kitten Bowl and Fish Bowl, in 2014), and the Lingerie Bowl, a series of pay-per-view broadcasts of all-female football games played in lingerieproving popular enough to be expanded into its own Lingerie Football League with the Lingerie Bowl as its championship game. The LFL was later re-launched as a conventional women's football league, the Legends Football League, and moved its season to run during the NFL off-season instead.

During the 1990s, MTV was a recurring provider of counterprogramming, having scheduled new episodes of Beavis and Butt-head against the halftime show on multiple occasions. In 1998, MTV aired a pilot episode for a new stop-motion animated series, Celebrity Deathmatch. In the spirit of the Super Bowl airings, its official premiere in May 1998 was scheduled to air on the same night as the series finale of Seinfeld.

On several occasions, the professional wrestling promotion WWF (now WWE) broadcast special halftime editions of its Sunday-night program on USA Network at the time, Sunday Night Heat, dubbed Halftime Heat. The concept was revived for Super Bowl LIII by WWE's NXT brand as a streaming special on WWE Network and other platforms, featuring the premiere of a 6-man tag-team match at halftime, as well as a marathon of classic NXT matches.

On the day of the Super Bowl, cable channels often air special, and sometimes themed marathons of existing programming prior to and/or during the game, such as Cartoon Network having aired a marathon of 2 Stupid Dogs that it dubbed the "Stupid Bowl", DIY Network broadcasting a marathon of bathroom-related programming known as the "Toilet Bowl", a "Poppy Bowl" marathon of Dr. Pimple Popper on TLC that additionally featured behind-the-scenes content and updates on featured patients, and during Super Bowl XLV, Canadian network Global airing a marathon of Glee and Glee-themed episodes of other series, to lead into the new episode "The Sue Sylvester Shuffle" after the game (competing network CTV is the Canadian rightsholder of the NFL and Super Bowl, but not Glee).

See also 
 Counterprogramming (film distribution)
 List of Super Bowl commercials

References 

Lists of American television series
Counterprogramming
Counterprogramming
Counterprogramming